George Lascelles (by 1499 – November 1558), of Sturton and Gateford, Nottinghamshire, was an English politician.

He was a Member (MP) of the Parliament of England for Nottinghamshire in March 1553.

References

15th-century births
1558 deaths
English MPs 1553 (Edward VI)
People from Bassetlaw District